Here is a list of, in the United Kingdom, the Crown Dependencies, and British Overseas Territories, schools which only admit boys, or those which only admit boys at certain levels/years/grades, or those which follow the Diamond Schools model (separating students by gender at points).

England
 Bedfordshire
 Bedford School
 Challney High School for Boys
 Berkshire
 Eton College
 Devon
 Devonport High School for Boys
 Torquay Boys' Grammar School
 Essex
 New Hall School Boys' Senior School
 Greater London
 Ernest Bevin Academy
 Brondesbury College
 Central Foundation Boys' School
 City of London School
 Darul Uloom London
 Dulwich College
 Forest Hill School
 Gunnersbury Boys' School
 Harrow School
 London Oratory School (boys only for ages 7–16, coed for ages 16–18)
 Norlington School for Boys
 Royal Liberty School
 St Paul's School, London
 Tawhid Boys School
 Tiffin School for Boys (boys only for secondary, coed for sixth form) 
 Westminster School (boys only for primary and secondary, coed for sixth form)
 Greater Manchester
 Altrincham Grammar School for Boys
 Bolton School Single Sex Junior, Senior, and Sixth Form schools
 Bury Grammar School
 Burnage Academy for Boys
 Darul Uloom Bolton
 Manchester Grammar School
 Manchester Mesivta School
 Hampshire
 Winchester College
 Hertfordshire
 Berkhamsted School Separate Boys' Senior School
 Haberdashers' Aske's Boys' School
 Richard Hale School
 Hitchin Boys' School
 Merchant Taylors' School, Northwood
 St Albans School
 Verulam School (formerly St Albans Boys' Modern School and St Albans Grammar School for Boys) - Boys only for ages 11-16 and coed for sixth form
 Watford Grammar School for Boys
 Kent
 Dartford Grammar School (coed for sixth-form, with pre-sixth-form grades reserved for boys)
 Dover Grammar School for Boys
 Simon Langton Grammar School for Boys
 Sir Joseph Williamson's Mathematical School (coed for sixth-form, with pre-sixth-form grades reserved for boys)
 Tonbridge School
 Tunbridge Wells Grammar School for Boys
 Wilmington Grammar School for Boys
 the howardschool for boys

 Lancashire
 Tauheedul Islam Boys' High School
 Leicestershire
 Loughborough Grammar School
 Lincolnshire
 Boston Grammar School (coed for sixth-form, with pre-sixth-form grades reserved for boys)
 The King's School, Grantham
 Newcastle
 Newcastle School for Boys
 Northamptonshire
 Northampton School for Boys
 Potterspury Lodge School
 Oxfordshire
 Magdalen College School, Oxford (boys only except for sixth form, which is coed)
 Radley College
 Surrey
 Charterhouse School (sixth form coeducational since 1971, coeducational for ages 13+ since 2017, will be fully coeducational by 2023)
 More House School, Frensham
 St James Independent Schools Senior Boys' School
 West Midlands
 King Edward's School, Birmingham
 West Sussex
 Chichester High School For Boys

Former
 Abbotsholme School
 Cambridgeshire High School for Boys, which became Long Road Sixth Form College
 City of Oxford High School for Boys
 Haileybury and Imperial Service College
 Handsworth Wood Boys' School
 Heatherdown School
 Littlemoss High School: merged with Droylsden School, Mathematics and Computing College for Girls to form Droylsden Academy
 Manchester Central Grammar School/High School for Boys, which merged into Manchester Academy in 1967
 Norwich High School for Boys, which became Langley School
 Purley High School for Boys, which became Coulsdon Sixth Form College
 Repton School (now coeducational)
 Rugby School (sixth form became coeducational in 1975 and became fully coeducational circa 1992)
 Sedbergh School (became coeducational circa 2001)
 Shrewsbury School (became fully coeducational in 2014)
 St George's School, Ascot (converted into a girls' school)
 St John's School, Leatherhead – fully coeducational since 2012 
 St Peter's School, York (single-sex until 1976; fully coeducational since 1987)
 Wandsworth School
 Warwick School for Boys
 Westholme School previously had a separate boys' junior school
 Woolverstone Hall School
 Wyggeston Grammar School for Boys, which became Wyggeston and Queen Elizabeth I College
 Wykeham House School - had separate boys and girls schools - closed

Northern Ireland
 Ashfield Boys' High School 
 Belfast Boys' Model School

Scotland
 Stewart's Melville College

 former boys' schools
 Hutchesons' Grammar School (had separate boys' school - became coeducational in 1976)

British Crown Dependencies
 Guernsey
 Elizabeth College, Guernsey
 Jersey
 De La Salle College, Jersey
 Victoria College, Jersey

British Overseas Territories
 Gibraltar
 Formerly for boys only: Bayside Comprehensive School (now coeducational)

See also
 List of girls' schools in the United Kingdom

References

Boys
Boys' schools in the United Kingdom